Schlangenbach may refer to:

Schlangenbach (Altmühl), a river of Bavaria, Germany, tributary of the Altmühl
Schlangenbach (Regnitz), a river of Bavaria, Germany, tributary of the Regnitz